The Interroll Worldwide Group is a manufacturer of products for unit-load handling systems, internal logistics and automation.

Established in 1959 and listed on the Swiss Stock Exchange, the Interroll Group employs 2500 people at 35 subsidiaries worldwide and generated 2022 a turnover of 664 million Swiss francs.
Headquartered and directed by a strategic holding company located in Sant' Antonino, Ticino in Switzerland, the group operates with two business divisions: "Global Sales & Service"  and "Products & Technology".

Field of activities
Interroll is a manufacturer of products for unit-load handling systems, internal logistics and automation. These are used primarily within the area of food processing, airport logistics, postal services, distribution and in various segments of industry. The products include drum motors for belt conveyors, DC-powered and non-powered rollers for conveyor systems; flow storage modules for compact pallet/container racking systems in distribution centres; crossbelt sorters, belt curves and other conveyor modules for material flow systems. Interroll serves more than 28,000 customers, mainly regional plant manufacturers and engineering specialists as well as system integrators, multinational companies and users.

History
Founded in 1959 by Dieter Specht and Hans vom Stein in Wermelskirchen, Germany.

Between 1968 and 1973 Interroll concluded joint ventures in France, the UK, Denmark, the Benelux countries and Spain. The company developed in the subsequent one as a belt drive used mini-drum motor, ball caster and in cooperation with the Italian Rulmeca, severe conveyor rollers for bulk material applications.

1986 the company concentrated all injection molding production at the newly created site in Sant' Antonio in Switzerland and moved 3 years later the groups headquarter there.

1989 Foundation of the Swiss Holding, establishing the holding.

In 1997, the company went public and floated on the Swiss Stock Exchange

In 2000, the company founder Dieter Specht, gave the Corporate Executive Board to the new CEO Paul Zumbühl.
Subsequently, Zumbühl realigned the group strategically and disposed non-core activities.

In 2013, Interoll took over the US-company Portec, Inc. in Cañon City, Colorado.

In 2019, its 18th manufacturing subsidiary started operations in Thailand, which will be followed by a factory in Suzhou, PRC.

In 2021, Ingo Steinkrüger followed Paul Zumbühl as CEO. Zumbühl became Active Chairman of interroll at the same time to ease this transition.
Also, Interroll acquired the Austrian company MITmacher GmbH in Linz to create the new Center of Excellence Software & Electronics.

References

External links
3PLNews-Logistics and Supply Chain Innovations: Interroll Holding AG
Bloomberg stock quote Interroll

Logistics
Automation organizations
Manufacturing companies of Switzerland